Armbrae Academy is an independent, university preparatory, co-educational, non-denominational day school from Preschool to Grade 12 in Halifax,  Nova Scotia, Canada. It is accredited by and a member of Canadian Accredited Independent Schools.

Facilities

The grounds of the school consist of a forest, playground, and small field covered with artificial turf. Armbrae completed construction of a multi-purpose building containing a gymnasium, art room and drama studio in April 2008.

All of the senior school's classrooms are equipped with Chromebooks. Armbrae also has a computer lab with more than 20 computers. All computers in the school are connected to the school's wireless network. 
The main building at Armbrae is undergoing a greening project. This project includes the replacement of older single-pane windows, all old energy-inefficient lights, and the original oil-fired boilers by more efficient natural gas burners.

Overview 
The school has a very capable staff. The teachers working there create a very safe learning environment and they offer help to those in need. The schools facilities are decent. The curriculum is very interesting. The athletics programs are very inclusive and help new and improving athletes.

External links
 Armbrae Academy - official website

Preparatory schools in Nova Scotia
Private schools in Nova Scotia
Elementary schools in Nova Scotia
Middle schools in Nova Scotia
High schools in Nova Scotia
Schools in Halifax, Nova Scotia
Educational institutions established in 1887
1887 establishments in Nova Scotia